Borrampalem is a village located near Gandepalle in East Godavari district of Andhra Pradesh state in India. It is located on National Highway 16.

Demographics 
The local language is Telugu.

According to the 2011 census, the population of 1116 comprised 322 families. 579 were male and 537 female. The literacy rate was 58.52 per cent, compared to a state average of 67.02 per cent.

References

External links 
https://villageinfo.in/andhra-pradesh/east-godavari/gandepalle/borrampalem.html
Borrampalem Gram panchayat

Villages in East Godavari district